Lipps may refer to:
Lipps, Virginia
 Lipps Island
 Lipps Inc

Lipps is the surname of:
 Jere H. Lipps
 Louis Lipps
 Theodor Lipps